The Bumbacco Trophy is awarded annually to the regular season champion of the West division in the Ontario Hockey League. The trophy was inaugurated in 1994–95 season when the league realigned into three divisions. The award is named after former Sault Ste. Marie Greyhounds general manager, Angelo Bumbacco.

Winners
List of winners of the Bumbacco Trophy.

References

External links
 Ontario Hockey League

Ontario Hockey League trophies and awards
Awards established in 1995